Andrey Reinhardtovich Sigle (born 15 May 1964, Gorky, USSR) is a Russian film producer, film music composer, musician, head of the companies Proline Film and Studio ACDC.

Biography 
Andrey Sigle was born on May 17, 1964 in Gorky. Andrey started to study music since he was 5.

Sigle graduated from the Rimsky-Korsakov music college. In 1986 he entered Conservatory in the name of Rimsky-Korsakov, piano class (studio of Mr. Zarukin). He was invited by the head of Royal Swedish Academy of Music to study the profession of a film music composer, which became the unique precedent in Russia.

In the mid 1980s, he became interested in sequencers and other instruments which allow to imitate the sounds of the philharmonic orchestra. Andrey participated in recording of the albums for such music groups like Kino, Alisa, Nautilus Pompilius, and also projects for solo by Sergey Kuryokhin and Boris Grebenshchikov. He worked as an arranger and sound designer for their albums.

He also worked as a composer together with Victor Tsoi and Kino at the creation of Igla (The Needle) (1988), Sobachye serdtse (Heart of a Dog) (1988), took part in the project named Posetitel museya (A Visitor to a Museum) by Konstantin Lopushanskiy, the composer is Alfred Schnittke (1989).

Andrey made his debut as a film music composer after the shooting of Klesh (The Tick) (1990), produced by Alexander Baranov and Bakhit Kalibaev. This project had become a turning point in his career and from that moment Andrey started to compose music for motion pictures only.

Among his works are: Sensation by Boris Gorlov, Koleso lubvi (The Wheel of Love) by Ernest Yasan, Poslednee delo Varenogo (The last affair by Vareniy) by Vitaly Melnikov, Prohindiada-2 by Alexander Kaliagin, Russkaya Simfonia (Russian Symphony) by Konstantin Lopushansky, Chetirnadtsat tsvetov radugi (The Fourteen Colors of Rainbow) by Dmitry Svetozarov.

Siegle became the composer of a popular Russian serial named Ulitsi razbitih fonarey (Streets of Broken Lights). In 1998-2000 he composed for television series Agent natsionalnoy bezopasnosti (National Security Agent), Po imeni Baron (By the Name of Baron).

The new turn was marked with the projects Faust, Telets (Taurus), Otets i syn (Father and Son), Solntse (The Sun) where he worked together with Alexander Sokurov, Russian director. These projects were awarded a lot of prizes at the international festivals.

A.S.D.S. Cinema Production Company was established in 2002 by Andrey Siegle and Russian producer Dmitry Svetozarov. The serial Tantsor (The Dancer), Tri tsveta lubvi (Three colors of Love) were released by this studio. Nastoiashie menti (The true Cops) and Favorsky are successfully completed.

Proline-film Studio was established by Andrey Sigle in 2004. This studio specializes in feature films. The Sun by Alexander Sokurov (in cooperation with Nikola-film) was presented at the 55th Anniversary International Berlin Film Festival, Gadkie lebedi (The Ugly Swans) by Konstantin Lopushansky won “Best Music” award on Sochi Open Russian Film Festival in 2006. Siegle is a film music composer and a producer of this project. He is a co-producer of French-Russian project "Serko" (together with CDP Studio, producer Catherine Dussart) by producer Joel Farges. The opening night is planned to be held in March 2006. Siegle was also awarded a prestigious prize for "Best music" in the Udalyonnyy dostup (The Remote Access), a feature film by Svetlana Proskurina, at Kinotavr cinema festival in Sochi.

In 2014 Andrey Sigle was nominated for Nika Award in “Best Music” competition (film «The Role», 2013).

Andrey Sigle is currently living and working in Saint-Petersburg.

Filmography

Producer
2013 The Role (directed by Konstantin Lopushnsky starring Maksim Sukhanov)
2013 Arventur
2011 Faust 
2010 Missing Man  
2009 Love without rules
2009 Intonation 
2008 The Orchard (loosely based on Anton Chekhov's play "The Cherry Orchard")
2008 Dealer (serial)
2008 A.D. (serial)
2008 Brothers (serial)
2007 Guide 
2007 Crime and Punishment (loosely based on Dostoevsky's novel "Crime and Punishment") (serial)
2007 Alexandra
2006 The Ugly Swans
2006 Serko 
2005 Favorsky (serial)
2004 The Sun
2003 Dancer (serial)
2003 By the name of Baron (serial)

Composer
2013 Arventur
2011 Faust 
2010 Missing Man
2009 Love without rules
2010 Missing Man 
2008 The Orchard 
2008 Brothers (serial)
2008 A.D. (serial)
2007 Alexandra 
2007 Crime and Punishment (serial)
2006 The Ugly Swans
2005 Favorsky  (serial)
2004 The Demon (animation)
2004 The Sun
2004 Remote Access
2003 Dancer (serial)
2003 Dinara Asanova 
2003 The Father and The Son
2003 By the name of Baron (serial)
2002 The Clown (animation) 
2000 14 Colours of Rainbow 
2000 National security agent (serial)
1999 Delicate thing 
1998 Streets of Broken Lights (serial)
1998 Hard time 
1996 Love strong as death
1995 Mary Pickford the pioneer 
1994 The Firing Range 
1994 The Wheel of Love 
1994 Last Case of Vareny 
1994 Prokhindiada 2 
1994 Russian Symphony
1993 Sensation 
1993 The Creation of Adam 
1993 Cynthia 
1993 Labirint of Love 
1992 Waiting Room 
1991 The Sacrifice for the Emperor 
1991 The Ring 
1990 The Tick

Musician
1989 Museum visitor 
1988 A Dog's Heart
1988 The needle

References

External links
Andrey Sigle Film studio

1964 births
Living people
Soviet male composers
Russian male composers
Russian producers
Saint Petersburg Conservatory alumni
20th-century Russian male musicians